Randall Bramblett (born 1948) is an American musician and singer-songwriter, whose career as a solo artist, session player, and touring musician, has spanned more than three decades.  He has worked with Gregg Allman, Bonnie Raitt, Goose Creek Symphony, Robbie Robertson, Elvin Bishop, Steve Winwood, Bonnie Bramlett, B.J. Thomas, Widespread Panic, Jay E.  Livingston and Roger Glover. He plays keyboards, saxophones, flute, guitar, mandolin, and harmonica, and his songwriting is influenced by blues, folk, and gospel music.

Life and career
Born in Jesup, Georgia, United States, Bramblett studied religion and psychology at the University of North Carolina, with the objective of entering the seminary.  However, finding inspiration in the music of James Taylor, Carole King, and Bob Dylan, he abandoned his theological studies and pursued songwriting, soon moving to Athens, Georgia.

After establishing himself as a session musician in the early 1970s, recording with artists like Gregg Allman and Elvin Bishop, Bramblett toured with bands such as the Gregg Allman Band, Sea Level, Widespread Panic, and Traffic. Bramblett, along with Chuck Leavell, has been credited with giving Sea Level, described as "a jazz-influenced spinoff from the Allman Brothers Band," a new, unique direction. Bramblett has been described as an outstanding lyricist and vocalist. The songs he wrote during his time with Sea Level have been described as "philosophical, despairing soul and funk tunes and rockers."

As of 2017, Bramblett has recorded a total of fourteen albums, with the first two, That Other Mile and Light of the Night, issued by Polydor in the 1975 and 1976, and multiple albums in each succeeding decade. Bramblett's 2001 album, No More Mr. Lucky, features Bramblett playing the Hammond B-3 and saxes. Tracks on that album has been described as rich, funky, hip, and raw.

In 2015, Bramblett released Devil Music. The title track was inspired by the story of Howlin' Wolf trying to reunite with his estranged mother, who had abandoned him for "playing the devil's music."

Discography

Randall Bramblett/The Randall Bramblett Band

Guest appearances

References

External links
Randall Bramblett website
Randall Bramblett Band on Myspace
Allmusic
Reviews at The Music Box

1948 births
Living people
American male singer-songwriters
New West Records artists
Musicians from Georgia (U.S. state)
People from Jesup, Georgia
Sea Level (band) members
Cowboy (band) members
Singer-songwriters from Georgia (U.S. state)